The Church Farm School (CFS) is a private secondary Christian school in Exton, Pennsylvania, United States. In 1985, the campus was listed as a historic district by the National Register of Historic Places.

History
The school was founded in 1918 by Charles Shreiner. Shreiner, an Episcopal clergyman, established the school in Glen Loch (now Exton) Pennsylvania, on Route 30 (Lincoln Highway), as a boarding school for boys from single-parent homes, primarily those without fathers. The sons of the clergy, members of the armed services, and police officers were a second focus of the school in its early days. Shreiner, because of his strict belief in the importance of discipline and a strong work ethic, was known to the boys as the "Colonel."

Shortly after its founding, the school acquired the Benjamin Pennypacker House property.   The school integrated in 1963. After Shreiner died in 1964, the Board of Directors placed the school under the direction of his son, Charles Shreiner, Jr., a World War II veteran who served until retirement in 1987. The school's third headmaster, Charles "Terry" Shreiner, III, the founder's grandson, led the school from 1987 and retired in 2009. Interim headmaster, Thomas Rodd, Jr., led the school before Edmund K. Sherrill II, an Episcopal clergyman, became headmaster in July 2009.

Over the first half of its history, the school's campus grew to 1700 acres, on which it operated a large farm with student labor. Each boy was required to work half of each school day and full-time for half of each summer. This enterprise included a large dairy farm and hog raising operation and produced many crops. The school gradually phased out agricultural activities, beginning in the mid-1970s, selling off most of the remaining farmland to developers by the late 1990s. The dairy barns and silos remain as a memorial of the agricultural era of the school's history.

Notable alumni 

 Jon Bradshaw, journalist
 Micheal Eric, Nigerian basketball player
 Jón Axel Guðmundsson, Icelandic basketball player

References

External links
Official website

Christian schools in Pennsylvania
Private high schools in Pennsylvania
Boarding schools in Pennsylvania
Preparatory schools in Pennsylvania
Nondenominational Christian schools in the United States
Educational institutions established in 1918
Schools in Chester County, Pennsylvania
School buildings on the National Register of Historic Places in Pennsylvania
Tudor Revival architecture in Pennsylvania
School buildings completed in 1918
Private middle schools in Pennsylvania
1918 establishments in Pennsylvania
Episcopal schools in the United States
Boys' schools in the United States
Historic districts on the National Register of Historic Places in Pennsylvania
National Register of Historic Places in Chester County, Pennsylvania